Gregor Bermbach (born 17 February 1981) is a German bobsledder who has competed since 2006. He has two World Cup victories in the four-man events during the 2008–09 season.

At the FIBT World Championships 2009 in Lake Placid, New York, Bermbach finished ninth in the two-man event while crashing out in the first run of the four-man event.

Bermach finished seventh in the four-man event and ninth in the two-man event at the 2010 Winter Olympics in Vancouver.

External links

 
 
 
 

1981 births
Bobsledders at the 2010 Winter Olympics
Bobsledders at the 2014 Winter Olympics
German male bobsledders
Living people
Olympic bobsledders of Germany